Indijk may refer to:

 the Dutch name of Yndyk, near Waldsein in Friesland, the Netherlands
 Indijk (Littenseradiel), near Boazum in Friesland, the Netherlands
 Indijk (Utrecht), a hamlet in the Netherlands
 Indijk, Súdwest-Fryslân